Stefy Bau is an Italian former professional motocross and supercross racer. After a career-ending injury in 2005, Stefy became the General Manager of the newly established FIM Fédération Internationale de Motocyclisme Women's World Motocross Championship. Bau is also a member of the CFM (Women Commission inside the FIM Fédération Internationale de Motocyclisme). As of 2019 she manages other racers, including Tanya Muzinda.

Career
Bau is considered to be one of the fastest women motocross racers in the world. In 2000 she became eligible to compete against the male racers in the field. She won three world championships, holds two WMX USA championships, and the Loretta Lynn AMA Amateur National Motocross Championship in addition to seven Italian Championships. In October 2005, Bau had the accident that ended her racing career.

Stefy was featured in EA Sports BIG's 2002 video game Freekstyle as a playable character alongside other real-life professional motocross and freestyle motocross riders.

At the end on 2019 she arranged for Zimbabwean motocross rider Tanya Muzinda and her family to move to Florida and she became her manager.

References

External links
 Stefy Bau at Exports Insider

Living people
Italian motocross riders
Female motorcycle racers
AMA Motocross Championship National Champions
Italian female cyclists
Downhill mountain bikers
Italian mountain bikers
Year of birth missing (living people)